Direct Instruction (DI) is a term for the explicit teaching of a skill-set using lectures or demonstrations of the material to students. A particular subset of direct instruction, denoted by capitalization as Direct Instruction, refers to a specific example of the approach developed by Siegfried Engelmann and Wesley C. Becker. DI teaches by explicit instruction, in contrast to exploratory models such as inquiry-based learning. DI includes tutorials, participatory laboratory classes, discussion, recitation, seminars, workshops, observation, active learning, practicum, or internships. Model includes "I do" (instructor), "We do" (instructor and student/s), "You do" (student practices on their own with instructor monitoring).

DI relies on a systematic and scripted curriculum, delivered by highly trained instructors. On the premise that all students can learn and all teachers successfully teach if given effective training in specific techniques, teachers may be evaluated based on measurable student learning. 

In some special education programs, direct instruction is used in resource rooms, when teachers assist with homework completion and academic remediation.

History
DISTAR was a specific direct instruction model developed by Siegfried Engelmann and Wesley C. Becker. Engelmann and Becker sought to identify teaching methods that would accelerate the progress of historically disadvantaged elementary school students.

Direct Instruction was first formally implemented at a preschool program for children from impoverished backgrounds at the University of Illinois (mid-1960s). The team implementing DI consisting of Siegfried Engelmann, Carl Bereiter, and Jean Osborn. The program incorporated short instructional periods usually 20 to 30 minutes a day. The instructional periods focused on language, reading, and math. The children showed vast improvement which led to further development of the approach .
When further developing DI, they applied the same principles to create a formal instructional program that included language, reading, and math. The formal program was termed DISTAR, for Direct Instruction System for Teaching Arithmetic and Reading.
In the late 1960s, Project Follow Through included DI as one of the programs to compare the outcomes of over 20 different educational interventions in high-poverty communities. The study was a large government-funded study that was implemented over a multiyear period. DI was implemented in 19 different sites which ranged in demographic and geographic characteristics. The results indicated that DI was the only intervention that had significantly positive impacts on all outcomes that were measured. 

Direct Instruction has been effectively delivered through peers to students with learning disabilities.
Peer delivery offers teachers new ways to use the curriculum. The approach has also been examined as a model to assist students in a resource room with homework completion, bolster executive functioning skills, and improve teacher efficiency.

Success for All

Another popular direct instruction approach is the Success for All program which uses scripted teaching to instruct elementary children in phonics and intensive reading in their instruction program. What the teacher says is carefully scripted in the program. The program was designed by Johns Hopkins University professor Robert Slavin in the mid-1980s for failing schools in Baltimore, Maryland. The program requires a dedicated 90 minutes of reading instruction in which the teacher must follow a pre-ordained lesson plan that has every minute filled with scripted instruction and specific activities designed to teach reading. Not all experts were in favor of this instructional approach. For instance, Jonathan Kozol criticized the program in his book, The Shame of the Nation, for being excessively dogmatic, utilitarian, and authoritarian.

English language learners (ELL) students could also benefit from Direct Instruction. The program for teaching English to Spanish speaking students begins with teachers giving instruction in Spanish and then gradually incorporating more and more English in the directions. As with all Direct Instruction programs, the Direct Instruction groups are kept small and commingled with others of similar skill levels.

Effectiveness

Features that make Direct Instruction effective:
Only 10% of material is new while the remaining 90% of material is a review of previously taught content.
Students are grouped based on their skill levels that is determined by assessments administered before commencing the Direct Instruction program.
Emphasis is on student's pace by either slowing down, reteaching, or accelerating through easily understood material.
External validity of Direct Instruction has been tested and the program is research-based.
Debates about the efficacy of DI have raged before the final results of Project Follow Through were published; however, there is substantial empirical research supporting its effectiveness. A meta-analysis published by Adams & Engelmann (1996), a chief architect of the DI program, finds a "mean effect size average per study...(as) more than .75, which confirms that the overall effect is substantial." A 2018 meta-analysis by Stockard et al. found an average effect on test scores of approximately 0.6 standard deviations.

In some special education programs, it is used in a resource room with small groups of students. Some research has shown there is benefit with this model.

Direct Instruction is used with students from every population segment (with regard to poverty, culture, and race). In Project Follow Through, the DI model was ranked first in achievement for poor students, students who were not poor, urban students, rural students, African American students, Hispanic students, and Native American students. Today, many of the Bureau of Indian Affair's highest-performing schools use Direct Instruction materials. The Baltimore Curriculum Project has many schools with Free and Reduced Lunch Rates above 75% serving student populations that are more than 90% African American. These schools have shown strong achievement gains using Direct Instruction.

Meta-analysis of 85 single-subject design studies comparing direct instruction to other teaching strategies found the effects to be substantial for students with learning disabilities; however, when qualified by IQ and reading levels, strategy instruction (SI) had better effects for the high IQ group. For the low-IQ discrepancy groups, higher effect sizes were yielded for a Combined DI and SI Model when compared to all competing models. With the exception of handwriting, DI's effects were all above 0.8 (i.e., reading and mathematics).

John Hattie's Visible Learning: A Synthesis of Over 800 Meta-Analyses Relating to Achievement (2009) summarizes the results of four meta-analyses that examined Direct Instruction. These analyses incorporated 304 studies of over 42,000 students. Across all of these students, the average effect size was 0.59 and was significantly larger than those of any other curriculum Hattie studied.

Direct Instruction is recognized as one of two effective models of comprehensive school reform and, in many cases, can be integrated into a tiered model system to address students with developing problems. The findings from Project Follow Through, conducted in a variety of selected communities throughout the United States, suggest that Direct Instruction is the most effective model for teaching academic skills and for affective outcomes (e.g., self-esteem) of children. Recent large-scale studies (1997–2003), such as the Baltimore Curriculum Project, show that it is possible to help schools that are in the lowest twenty percentile  with respect to academic achievement steadily improve until they are performing well above average. In some cases, school achievement improved from the 16th percentile to above the 90th percentile.

Criticism
Common criticisms:
Teachers often express animosity towards the methods of Direct Instruction claiming that it limits both student and teacher creativity in the classroom due to its strict, scripted procedures.

Another common concern with Direct Instruction programs is their expense. Many argue that the current expense of implementing Direct Instruction programs is too high and unreasonable for low SES schools and school districts. The prices of student workbooks are about $20 while teacher workbook prices can range from $180-$232 as seen on the McGraw Hill website who is the main distributor of Direct Instruction materials (NIFDI, 2005).

Other criticisms:
One three-year study of methods of teaching reading showed that highly scripted, teacher-directed methods of teaching reading, were not as effective as traditional methods that allowed a more flexible approach. Urban teachers, in particular, expressed great concern over the DI's lack of sensitivity to issues of poverty, culture, and race.

The former president of the National Science Teachers Association (NSTA), Anne Tweed, questioned whether direct instruction was the most effective science teaching strategy. In the December 15, 2004 NSTA Reports she concluded that "direct instruction alone cannot replace the in-depth experience with science concepts that inquiry-based strategies provide."

Some critics also see DI as a betrayal of the humanistic, egalitarian foundations of adult public education. It is seen as a "canned" or "teacher proof" curriculum deliverable via unskilled teachers.

In Australia, where DI has been used in schools among several remote Indigenous Australians communities in Queensland, DI has been criticized for its high cost in return for only modest improvements in literacy and numeracy levels, as well as its US-centric theme which is alien to indigenous Australian cultures.

See also
Behaviorism (philosophy of education)
Instructional design

References

External links 
National Institute for Direct Instruction
What the Data Really Show: Direct Instruction Really Works!
Educational Resources web site: A Professional Staff Development Company Specializing in Direct Instruction Implementations
Zig Engelmann
Success for All Foundation website
Article on scripted education, "Do Scripted Lessons Work or Not" by Sarah Colt
Rubric for Identifying Authentic Direct Instruction Programs

Pedagogy
Educational psychology
Behaviorism